The 2020 South Korean Figure Skating Championships were held from January 3–5, 2020 at the Uijeongbu Indoor Ice Rink in Uijeongbu. It was the 74th edition of the event. Medals were awarded in the disciplines of men's singles, ladies' singles, and ice dance on the senior and junior levels. The results were part of the Korean selection criteria for the 2020 World Junior Championships and the 2020 World Championships.

Seoul was originally announced as the host, before the location was changed to Uijeongbu in November 2019.

Medal summary

Senior

Junior

Senior-level results

Men

Ladies

Ice dance

Junior-level results

Men

Ladies

Ice dance

International team selections

World Championships
The 2020 World Figure Skating Championships will be held in Montreal, Quebec, Canada from March 16–22, 2020.

Four Continents Championships
The 2020 Four Continents Figure Skating Championships will be held in Seoul, South Korea from February 4–9, 2020. The team was announced following an internal ranking competition in December 2019. Lee Hae-in placed second in the ladies' singles competition, but was age-ineligible to be chosen for the team.

World Junior Championships
Commonly referred to as "Junior Worlds", the 2020 World Junior Figure Skating Championships will take place in Tallinn, Estonia from March 2–8, 2020.

Winter Youth Olympics
The 2020 Winter Youth Olympics will be held in Lausanne, Switzerland from January 10–15, 2020. The team was announced on October 13, 2019.

References

External links 
 

South Korean Figure Skating Championships
South Korean Figure Skating Championships, 2020
Figure skating
January 2020 sports events in South Korea